Lakandasht (also known as Langadasht (Persian: لگندشت) and Lyachandash) is a village in Sanjabad-e Gharbi Rural District, in the Central District of Kowsar County, Ardabil Province, Iran. At the 2006 census, its population was 216, in 48 families.

References 

Tageo

Towns and villages in Kowsar County